Jan Koopmans (May 26, 1905, in Sliedrecht – March 24, 1945, in Amsterdam) was a Dutch theologian, best known for his works De Nederlandsche Geloofsbelijdenis (1939) and Wat wij wel en wat wij niet geloven (1941).

References 

1905 births
1945 deaths
Dutch theologians
Dutch civilians killed in World War II